Jonathan Waxman is an American chef who was one of the pioneers of California cuisine and is credited with being the first to bring its style, fusing French cooking techniques with the freshest local ingredients, to New York.

Biography
Born in 1950, Waxman grew up near Berkeley, California. After graduating from the University of Nevada at Reno, he found work playing in bands at casinos and later with a rock band named "Lynx".

Waxman eventually gave up his career as a trombonist to study at La Varenne cooking school in France. In 1979, he and restaurateur Michael McCarty opened Michael's Restaurant in an old mansion near the Santa Monica beach; the groundbreaking cuisine attracted diners from all over America. Five years later, he opened Jams Restaurant on East 79th Street in New York; the chance to dine with what New York Magazine called "an elder statesman of the new California cooking" made Jams the most sought after dining sensation of the season. His work at Jams made him a celebrity chef; "whoever said chefs in the 80's were like rock-and-roll stars", said one reviewer, "had Jonathan in mind." Among other restaurants created by Waxman are Bud's, Hulot's, Jams of London and Table 29. Esquire magazine put him on its list of most influential Americans.

Waxman is currently the chef-owner of Barbuto (restaurant) in New York City's West Village, Jams in New York City's Midtown, Brezza Cucina in Atlanta's Ponce City Market, Adele's in Nashville, and in 2016 opened Waxman's at Ghirardelli Square in San Francisco. According to New York Magazine, Barbuto's food is "rustic Italian," and the mood is "casually hip." His cookbook published by Simon & Schuster was released in 2011.

In 2018, Waxman served as a guest judge on season nine of MasterChef, and was introduced as the mentor of Aarón Sanchez. In 2021, he again appeared as a guest judge for the show on season eleven.

Top Chef: Masters
In 2010, Waxman was a contestant on Bravo's Top Chef: Masters. He was eliminated in the penultimate episode, placing fourth out of eighteen competitors.  James Oseland, one of the main judges for season two of Top Chef: Masters, has been quoted saying, "I think he is one of the country’s greatest chefs."

Personal life
He lives in Manhattan with his wife Sally and three children.

Notes

Chefs from New York City
Chefs from Berkeley, California
Living people
James Beard Foundation Award winners
American restaurateurs
1950 births